Bhume is a rural municipality located in Eastern Rukum District of Lumbini Province Province of Nepal.

Demographics
At the time of the 2011 Nepal census, 64.3% of the population in Bhume Rural Municipality spoke Nepali, 28.3% Magar, 5.6% Kham, 1.5% Gurung and 0.1% Ghale as their first language; 0.2% spoke other languages.

In terms of ethnicity/caste, 66.1% were Magar, 16.7% Kami, 8.8% Chhetri, 3.1% Damai/Dholi, 2.1% Gurung, 1.7% Newar, 0.4% Thakuri, 0.2% Badi and 0.9% others.

In terms of religion, 95.7% were Hindu, 1.8% Christian, 0.1% Prakriti and 2.4% others.

References

External links
 Official website

Populated places in Eastern Rukum District
Rural municipalities in Eastern Rukum District
Rural municipalities of Nepal established in 2017